Megabraula is a fly genus in the family Braulidae. These are very unusual flies, wingless and flattened, and barely recognizable as Diptera. Megabraula is found in Nepal and is 3 mm in length. Both species are found in the nests of Apis laboriosa

Species
Megabraula antecessor Grimaldi & Underwood, 1986
Megabraula onerosa Grimaldi & Underwood, 1986

References

Braulidae
Carnoidea genera
Pest insects
Diptera of Asia
Wingless Diptera
Taxa named by David Grimaldi